The 2017 WNBA season was the 21st season of the Women's National Basketball Association (WNBA). Its regular season began on May 13 with three games, highlighted by the defending WNBA champion Los Angeles Sparks hosting the Seattle Storm. It concluded on September 3. The playoffs began on September 6, and concluded on October 4, with the Minnesota Lynx defeating the Sparks in five games to win their fourth WNBA title.

It was the final season for the San Antonio Stars in the city that they had called home since 2003. After the season, parent company Spurs Sports & Entertainment sold the team to MGM Resorts International, which moved the team to Las Vegas. The former Stars now play as the Las Vegas Aces.

2017 WNBA Draft

The San Antonio Stars selected Kelsey Plum first in the 2017 WNBA Draft. The draft was televised nationally on the ESPN networks (Round 1 on ESPN2, Rounds 2 and 3 on ESPNU).

Arena changes
Two teams announced temporary arena changes for the 2017 season, both due to their regular arenas undergoing renovations during the WNBA season.
 The Atlanta Dream announced that they would move from Philips Arena to McCamish Pavilion on the campus of the Georgia Institute of Technology for the 2017 and 2018 seasons.
 The Minnesota Lynx announced that they would move from Target Center to the Xcel Energy Center in St. Paul for the 2017 season.

Team standings
Source:

Playoffs

Individual statistic leaders

Regular season

Playoffs

Season award winners

Player of the Week Award

Player of the Month Award

Rookie of the Month Award

Coach of the Month Award

Postseason awards

Coaches

Eastern Conference

Western Conference

Notes:
 Year with team does not include 2017 season.
 Records are from time at current team and are through the end the 2016 season.
 Playoff appearances are from time at current team only.
 WNBA Finals and Championships do not include time with other teams.
 Coaches shown are the coaches who began the 2017 season as head coach of each team.

References

 
Women's National Basketball Association seasons